Joseph John Zelenka (born March 9, 1976) is a former American football long snapper in the National Football League (NFL). He was signed by the San Francisco 49ers as an undrafted free agent in 1999. He played college football at Wake Forest.

Zelenka also played for the Washington Redskins, Jacksonville Jaguars and Atlanta Falcons.

Early years
Joe started playing football at a very early age in the Catholic Youth Organization football league in northern Ohio, playing for the St. Mary's Chargers (Berea, OH).

Zelenka attended Benedictine High School (Cleveland, Ohio) and was a letterman in football.  In football, as a senior, he was given the Coaches' Award and was a second-team All-State selection.

College career
Zelenka attended Wake Forest University and in addition to handling longsnapping duties, he was a tight end.  As a tight end, he finished his career with 25 receptions for 217 yards (8.68 yards per rec, avg.).

External links
Jacksonville Jaguars bio

1976 births
Living people
Players of American football from Cleveland
American football tight ends
American football long snappers
Wake Forest Demon Deacons football players
San Francisco 49ers players
Washington Redskins players
Jacksonville Jaguars players
Atlanta Falcons players
American people of Czech descent